Dipdap is a children's programme on CBeebies, in which a drawn line creates endless challenges and surprises for the unsuspecting little character Dipdap.

Background
The series was created by Steve Roberts and produced by Ragdoll Productions.

Broadcast

The series aired on CBeebies in the United Kingdom. In Canada, The series was broadcast on TFO.
TFO
CBeebies

Awards
Dipdap won the 2011 British Academy Children's Award in the "Short Form" category.

Episodes

References

External links

BBC children's television shows
Television series by DHX Media
Television series by Ragdoll Productions
British children's animated adventure television series
British preschool education television series
2010s British children's television series
2011 British television series debuts
2013 British television series endings
English-language television shows
2010s British animated television series
CBeebies
Animated preschool education television series
2010s preschool education television series
Animated television series without speech